Andreas Umland (born 1967) is a political scientist studying contemporary Russian and Ukrainian history as well as regime transitions. He has published on the post-Soviet extreme right, municipal decentralization, European fascism, post-communist higher education, East European geopolitics, Ukrainian and Russian nationalism, the Donbas and Crimea conflicts, as well as the neighborhood and enlargement policies of the European Union. He is a Senior Expert at the Ukrainian Institute for the Future in Kyiv as well as a Research Fellow at the Swedish Institute for International Affairs in Stockholm. He lives in Kyiv, and teaches as an Associate Professor of Politics at the National University of Kyiv-Mohyla Academy. In 2005–2014, he was involved in the creation of a new Master's program in German and European Studies administered jointly by the Kyiv-Mohyla Academy and Jena University.

Biography 
Born in 1967 in the city of Jena, Thuringia, East Germany, Umland was educated at the Erich Weinert Special High School for Preparation to Russian Teacher Studies (Spezialoberschule zur Vorbereitung auf das Russischlehrerstudium, EWOS) at Wiesenburg, Mark Brandenburg, in 1981–1985. He studied Russian, journalism, history and politics at the Karl Marx University of Leipzig in 1989–1990 (State-Certified Translator / Staatlich geprüfter Übersetzer), Free University of Berlin in 1990–1992 and 1994–1995 (Otto Suhr Institute, Political Science Diploma / Diplom-Politologe), University of Oxford in 1992–1994 (St. Cross College, Master of Philosophy in Russian and East European Studies M.Phil.) and Stanford University in 1996–1997 (Master of Arts in Political Science A.M.), with scholarships from the Friedrich Ebert Foundation, Foreign and Commonwealth Office, German Academic Exchange Service (DAAD), and German Academic Scholarship Foundation (ERP-Stipendienprogramm der Studienstiftung des Deutschen Volkes).

In 1999, he received a D.Phil. (Doctor of Philosophy) degree in History from the Free University of Berlin (Friedrich Meinecke Institute), with a dissertation on the rise of Vladimir Zhirinovsky in Russian politics (NaFöG Scholarship of the Land Berlin). In 2008, he received a PhD (Doctor of Philosophy) degree in Politics from the University of Cambridge (Trinity College / Faculty of Social and Political Sciences), with a dissertation on post-Soviet Russian "uncivil society" (Kurt Hahn Trust Scholarship).

He was a NATO Fellow at Stanford's Hoover Institution on War, Revolution and Peace in 1997–1999, and Thyssen Fellow at Harvard's Weatherhead Center for International Affairs and Davis Center for Russian Studies, in 2001–2002. He taught, as a Civic Education Project and Bosch Foundation Visiting Lecturer, at the Faculty of International Relations of the Ural State University of Yekaterinburg, in 1999–2001, and Department of Political Science of the National University of Kyiv-Mohyla Academy, in 2002–2003. In January–December 2004, he was a Temporary Lecturer in Russian and East European Studies, at the University of Oxford, and a Fellow of St.Antony's College Oxford. Umland was a German Academic Exchange Service (DAAD) Lecturer at the Institute of International Relations of Kyiv Shevchenko University, in 2005–2008, as well as Department of Political Science of the Kyiv-Mohyla Academy, in 2010–2014. In 2008–2010, Umland was a Senior Lecturer (Akademischer Rat) in Contemporary East European History at the Faculty of Historical and Social Studies at Catholic University of Eichstätt-Ingolstadt in Bavaria, and, in 2019–2021, an Adjunct Professor (Lehrbeauftragter) of Post-Soviet Affairs at the Institute of Political Science at the Friedrich Schiller University of Jena.

In 2014, he became a Senior Fellow at the Institute for Euro-Atlantic Cooperation (Ukr.: IEAS) in Kyiv, in 2019, a Nonresident Fellow at the Center for European Politics of the Institute of International Relations (Czech: UMV) in Prague, and, in 2020, a Senior Expert at the Program for European, Regional and Russian Studies of the Ukrainian Institute for the Future (Ukr.: UIM) in Kyiv as well as a Research Fellow at the Russia and Eurasia Program of the Swedish Institute of International Affairs (Swed.: UI) in Stockholm.

Membership 
Umland is a member of the:

 Board of Trustees of the Boris Nemtsov Academic Center for the Study of Russia at Prague;
 Board of Directors of COMFAS – The International Association for Comparative Fascist Studies in Budapest; 
 Advisory Council of the NGO "Rights in Russia" in Somerset, UK;
 Board of Advisors of the Andrei Sakharov Research Center for Democratic Development in Kaunas;
 Circle of Friends of the German-Ukrainian Platform "Kyiv Dialogue" in Berlin;
 KomRex – The Center for Right-Wing Extremism Studies, Democracy Education and Social Integration in Jena;
 Valdai Discussion Club in Moscow.

Editor 
Umland has been the founder and general editor of the scholarly book series "Soviet and Post-Soviet Politics and Society" (est. in 2004) as well as founder and collector of the book series "Ukrainian Voices" (est. in 2019) published by ibidem-Verlag at Stuttgart / Hannover and distributed by Columbia University Press. He is a co-editor, since 2008, of the Bavaria-based Russian web journal "Форум новейшей восточноевропейской истории и культуры" (Forum for Contemporary East European History and Culture). 
He is a member of the Editorial boards of the "Explorations of the Far Right" book series, "Journal of Soviet and Post-Soviet Politics and Society" and "Forum für osteuropäische Ideen- und Zeitgeschichte“ (Forum for East European Ideas and Contemporary History)  published by ibidem-Verlag at Stuttgart / Hannover, "Fascism: Journal of Comparative Fascist Studies" (Brill Publishers, Leiden, and NIOD, Amsterdam), "CEU Political Science Journal" (Central European University, Budapest), as well as "The Ideology and Politics Journal" (Foundation for Good Politics, Kyiv).

Statements 
In February 2014, Andreas Umland was the initiator and author of an open letter from experts on Ukrainian nationalism, urging Western commentators not to emphasize the participation of the far-right in the Euromaidan and Revolution of Dignity, as this could be used by Russian propaganda.

Andreas Umland was the initiator and author of the text of an open letter of more than a hundred German-speaking experts on Eastern Europe dated 11 December 2014, in which the authors of the open letter of 60 German, mostly former politicians, which from pro-Russian positions called for "to prevent a new large-scale war in Europe". Umland's joint statement by a hundred experts and scholars, entitled "Protect Peace, Not Encourage Expansion," makes it clear that Russia is clearly acting as an aggressor in the Ukrainian conflict.

In 2015, Andreas Umland was among scholars from around the world who called on Ukrainian President Petro Poroshenko and Verkhovna Rada Speaker Volodymyr Groysman not to sign bills on the legal status and commemoration of Ukraine's independence fighters in the twentieth century (№2538-1) and "On the condemnation of the communist and National Socialist (Nazi) totalitarian regimes in Ukraine and the prohibition of propaganda of their symbols" (№2558).

In June 2018, Umland supported an open letter from cultural figures, politicians and human rights activists calling on world leaders to speak in defense of Ukrainian director Oleg Sentsov, a prisoner in Russia, and other political prisoners.

References

External links 
Scopus Author ID

WorldCat Identity

AcademicInfluence.com site

AcademicTree site

Amazon author site

MeinProf.de site

GoogleScholar site

MicrosoftAcademic site

ResearchGate site

Academia.edu site

1967 births
Living people
Writers from Jena
People from Bezirk Gera
German political scientists
21st-century German historians
German translators
Ukrainian studies
German male non-fiction writers
Russian studies scholars
Alumni of Trinity College, Cambridge
Free University of Berlin alumni
Stanford University alumni
Alumni of St Cross College, Oxford
Academic staff of the National University of Kyiv-Mohyla Academy
Academic staff of the Taras Shevchenko National University of Kyiv
Academic staff of Ural State University
Academic staff of the Catholic University of Eichstätt-Ingolstadt